True Grime: Crime Scene Clean Up was a documentary series on Investigation Discovery that premiered on July 19, 2011. The series followed Neal Smither, owner of Crime Scene Cleaners, and his crew as they clean up a grisly crime scene.

After the first three episodes, the series was cancelled.

Production 
The series was shot on location in Oakland, CA.

Episodes 
Only three episodes were created:

Road Rage:
World Premiere: Tuesday, July 19, 2011 
Crime Scene Cleaners tackle the car of a woman whose boyfriend was killed in a road rage incident.

Running Ragged:
World Premiere: Tuesday, July 26, 2011 
The crew is running ragged trying to clean up a decomposing body in a hoarder's house. Rookie cleaner Mike Downer worries about his job security and working a lot of gruesome late night calls.

New Blood:
World Premiere: Tuesday, August 2, 2011 
The crew is dispatched to disinfect the site where a decomposing body has been discovered.

Crime Scene Cleaners 
Smither started his company after being inspired by a scene from the film Pulp Fiction. At the time, there were very few businesses equipped to clean the aftermath of murders, suicides and decomposing bodies; the responsibility of clean up would fall on the victims family. The business originally appeared on 2003 Insomniac with Dave Attell's Oakland episode.

References

External links 
 "Investigation.Discovery.com"

Investigation Discovery original programming
2011 American television series debuts
2011 American television series endings